Wila Wilani (Aymara wila blood, blood-red, the reduplication indicates that there is a group or a complex of something, "the one with a complex of red color", Hispanicized and possibly erroneous spellings  Velaveiane, Velarelane) or Ch'ankha Qullu ("wool cord mountain", Chancacollo) is a mountain in the Andes of southern Peru, about  high. It is located in the Moquegua Region, Mariscal Nieto Province, Carumas District, and in the Tacna Region, Candarave Province, Candarave District. It lies west of a lake named Aqhuya Ch'alla (Ajuachaya, Pasto Grande), northwest of Paxsi Awki and east of Churi Laq'a, Ch'alluma and Ch'ankhani.

References

Mountains of Moquegua Region
Mountains of Tacna Region
Mountains of Peru